Bistrița (also known as Bistrița Vâlceană) is a right tributary of the river Olt in Romania. It discharges into the Olt near Băbeni. It starts in the Căpățânii Mountains forming one of the narrowest gorges in Romania and some beautiful caves. It flows through the villages Bistrița, Costești, Bălțățeni, Tomșani, Foleștii de Jos and Frâncești.

Tributaries
The following rivers are tributaries of the river Bistrița (from source to mouth):

Left: Costești, Otăsău
Right: Valea Rece, Cuca, Gurgui, Bistricioara, Iazul Morților

References

Rivers of Romania
Rivers of Vâlcea County